Quinhagak (Russian: Куинагак) is a city in Bethel Census Area, Alaska, United States. As of the 2010 census, the population of the city is 669, up from 555 in 2000.

The Yupik name for the village is Kuinerraq, meaning "new river channel." It has been dated to at least 1000 AD.

Quinhagak is near the Nunalleq archaeological site, which has "easily the largest collection of pre-contact Yup'ik material anywhere," according to anthropologist Rick Knecht. Thousands of items dating from 1350 to 1670 have been uncovered. These include many organic artifacts preserved in permafrost. The site is located along eroding coastline and up to 75% of the original site is thought to have washed away as of 2013, including the original excavation site.

Geography
It is situated on the Kanektok River and near the Arolik River, approximately a mile from the Kuskokwim Bay of the Bering Sea.

Demographics

Quinhagak has appeared under six different names on census records over the course of a century. It first appeared on the 1880 U.S. Census as the unincorporated Inuit village of "Quinchahamute." In 1890, it returned as "Quinhaghamiut." In 1900, it returned as "Kwiniak." In 1910, it returned as "Kwinak", with the alternative spelling of "Quinhagak." In 1920 and 1930, it appeared exclusively under its present spelling of Quinhagak. From 1940 to 1970, it was spelled as "Kwinhagak." It was formally incorporated in 1975 with the current spelling of Quinhagak.

As of the census of 2000, there were 555 people, 137 households, and 113 families residing in the city. The racial makeup of the city was 96.04% Native American, 1.26% from two or more races, and 2.70% White  0.72% of the population were Hispanic or Latino of any race.

There were 137 households, out of which 50.4% had children under the age of 18 living with them, 56.2% were married couples living together, 12.4% had a female householder with no husband present, and 16.8% were non-families. 12.4% of all households were made up of individuals, and 1.5% had someone living alone who was 65 years of age or older.  The average household size was 4.05 and the average family size was 4.52.

In the city, the population was spread out, with 37.1% under the age of 18, 9.5% from 18 to 24, 29.5% from 25 to 44, 16.0% from 45 to 64, and 7.7% who were 65 years of age or older.  The median age was 27 years. For every 100 females, there were 109.4 males.  For every 100 females age 18 and over, there were 115.4 males.

The median income for a household in the city was $25,156, and the median income for a family was $25,313. Males had a median income of $23,750 versus $36,250 for females. The per capita income for the city was $8,127.  About 27.2% of families and 26.1% of the population were below the poverty line, including 34.0% of those under age 18 and 25.0% of those age 65 or over.

Economy
The village hosts a commercial fishing industry and fish plant (not operational since the Platinum Fish Processing Plants opening in 2010). Although a commercial fishing village, there has been no commercial fishing since the local processor, Coastal Villages Seafood/Coastal Villages Region Fund, stopped buying salmon since 2016.

Most Quinhagak households practice subsistence hunting and gathering in addition to any wage work they are able to find, utilizing the village's excellent location for salmon and trout fishing, bird, caribou, and moose hunting, and berry picking. Much of the work available is government-funded (through the Lower Kuskokwim School District, which runs the local school, or through the Native Village of Kwinhagak).

Education
Lower Kuskokwim School District operates the Kuinerrarmiut Elitnaurviat School, K-12.  The school has approximately 220 students enrolled with 37 staff members.

References

Cities in Alaska
Cities in Bethel Census Area, Alaska
Populated coastal places in Alaska on the Pacific Ocean
Populated places established in the 10th century